Virginia Bradford (born Ada Virginia Estes; November 7, 1899–October 30, 1995) was an American actress.

Biography
Bradford born Ada Virginia Estes in Memphis, Tennessee. She was a former reporter who worked as an actress in the late 1920s. Her films include The Country Doctor (1927) and Stage Madness (1927).

Filmography

Personal life 
Bradford married several times. In 1928, Bradford married Cedric Belfrage, but divorced two years later.
 Bradford's other husbands include Frederick Minter, Joseph Petrie Lyons, and Thomas Prentice.

On October 30, 1995 Bradford died in Indiana.

References

External links

Detailed 1990 biography, written by her cousin

1899 births
1995 deaths
American silent film actresses
20th-century American actresses
Actresses from Memphis, Tennessee